The 2008 UCI Mountain Bike & Trials World Championships were held in Val di Sole, Italy from 17 to 22 June 2008. The disciplines included were cross-country, downhill, four-cross, and trials. The event was the 19th edition of the UCI Mountain Bike World Championships and the 23rd edition of the UCI Trials World Championships.

Future three-time road world champion and seven-time Tour de France points classification winner Peter Sagan won the junior men's cross-country title.

Medal summary

Men's events

Women's events

Team events

Medal table

See also
2008 UCI Mountain Bike World Cup
UCI Mountain Bike Marathon World Championships

References

External links
 Official website
 Results for the mountain-bike events on cyclingnews.com
 Results for the trials events on uci.ch

UCI Mountain Bike World Championships
International cycle races hosted by Italy
UCI Mountain Bike and Trials World Championships